Mashtada is a rural locality (a selo) in Verkhneinkhelinsky Selsoviet, Akhvakhsky District, Republic of Dagestan, Russia. The population was 268 as of 2010.

Geography 
Mashtada is located on the left bank of the Akhvakh River, 4 km northwest of Karata (the district's administrative centre) by road. Rachabulda is the nearest rural locality.

References 

Rural localities in Akhvakhsky District